Jack Evans may refer to:

Sports

Football
 Jack Evans (footballer, born 1889) (1889–1971), Welsh international footballer
 Jack Evans (footballer, born 1891) (1891–1966), Australian rules footballer for Melbourne
 Jack Evans (American football) (1905–1980), American football player
 Jack Evans (footballer, born 1908) (1908–1960), Australian rules footballer for Geelong
 Jack Evans (footballer, born 1930), Australian rules footballer for St Kilda
 Jack Evans (footballer, born 1993), English footballer
 Jack Evans (footballer, born 1998), Welsh footballer
 Jack Evans (footballer, born 2000), English footballer

Rugby
 Jack Evans (rugby, born 1871) (1871–1924), rugby union and rugby league footballer who played in the 1890s
 Jack Evans (rugby union, born 1875) (1875–1947), for Wales and Blaina
 Jack Elwyn Evans (1897–1941), rugby union and rugby league footballer who played in the 1920s for Wales
 Jack Evans (English rugby league, born 1897) (1897–1940), rugby league footballer who played in the 1920s
 Jack Evans (rugby, 1940s–1950s), rugby union, and rugby league footballer for Newport (RU), Great Britain (RL), Wales and Hunslet

Other sports
 Jack Evans (ice hockey) (1928–1996), Canadian hockey player and coach in the NHL
 Jack Evans (wrestler) (born 1982), American

Politics
Jack Wilson Evans (1922–1997), mayor of Dallas, Texas, 1981–1983
Jack Evans (Australian politician) (1928–2009), Australian senator
Jack Evans (Washington, D.C. politician) (born 1953), member of the Council of the District of Columbia

Others
Jack Evans (musician) (born 1953), American drummer and composer in Reverend Zen
Jack Evans (EastEnders), a minor character in the BBC soap EastEnders

See also
John Evans (disambiguation)